John's vision of the Son of Man is a vision described in the Book of Revelation (Revelation 1:9-20) in which the author, identified as John, sees a person he describes as one "like the Son of Man" (verse 13). The Son of Man is portrayed in this vision as having a robe with a golden sash, white hair, eyes like blazing fire, feet like bronze and a voice like rushing waters. He holds seven stars in his right hand and has a double-edged sword coming out of his mouth. The vision is interpreted by Christians as the only identifiable physical description of Jesus in any form in the Christian biblical canon.

Account
John of Patmos, the author of the Book of Revelation, wrote how on the Lord's Day he was "in the Spirit", and heard a loud voice "like a trumpet" (Revelation 1:10). When he turned around, he saw this Son of Man figure. In Revelation 1:18, the figure identifies himself as "the First and the Last", who "was dead, and behold I am alive for ever and ever", a reference to the resurrection of Jesus.

Connection with the rest of the book
Some of the language used in Revelation 1 is also used in Revelation 19 to describe the Rider on the White Horse. In both places, he has a sword coming out of his mouth (1:16 and 19:15) and has "eyes like blazing fire" (1:14 and 19:12). The sword proceeding from Jesus’ mouth describes the counterintuitive way God's messiah conquers: by the word of God.

The Son of Man is portrayed as walking (2:1) among seven lampstands, which represent the seven churches of Asia (1:20). In Revelation 1:11, he says, "Write on a scroll what you see and send it to the seven churches". Chapters 2 and 3 report the content of the letters written to the angels of the seven churches. Throughout the letters he is identified in terms of the vision, such as "him who has the sharp, double-edged sword" (Revelation 2:12).

Connection with the Book of Daniel

There is a striking resemblance between John's and Daniel's visions of a son of man. In John's vision the Son of Man has white hair, a sword, and lampstands. In Daniel's vision the Son of Man has a body resembling tarshish, which Rabbi Rashi explains - quoting Tractate Hullin 9lb -  as the man being as large as the Tarshish Sea in Africa. Rashi interprets Daniel's Son of Man to be the archangel Gabriel.

In Jewish mysticism, the angels are the heavenly priests of God who serve in his heavenly temple in his heavenly Jerusalem; hence Gabriel wearing priestly robe and sash. Jesus is similarly depicted because, according to the New Testament, he is the eternal high priest of mankind.

Explanation and interpretation

William Hendriksen suggests that the whole of the vision "is symbolical of Christ, the Holy One, coming to purge His churches," and to "punish those who are persecuting His elect."

Significance of the seven stars
John tells us in Revelation 1:20 that the seven stars are the angels of the seven churches

In the New Testament, the Greek word for angels (aggelos) is not only used for heavenly angels, but also used for human messengers, such as John the Baptist. Merrill Unger is of the opinion that human messengers is the meaning of the stars. In commenting on this verse, C.I. Scofield states: "The natural explanation of the "messengers" [angels] is that they were men sent by the seven churches to ascertain the state of the aged apostle ... but they figure any who bear God's messages to a church."

Several New Testament scholars believe that the angels are not human messengers. Isbon Beckwith says they represent the churches "ideal conception of its immanent spirit". Henry Barclay Swete refers to the angels as the "prevailing spirit" of the church.

 
One aspect of the vision is the portrayal of Jesus holding seven stars in his right hand. Such a motif is also found on coins of the Emperor Domitian. Sometime between 77 and 81, Domitian's infant son died. He was subsequently deified, and is portrayed on coins of Domitian, with seven stars.  Ernest Janzen argues that the globe on which the infant stands represents world dominion and power, while the stars indicate his divine nature; he is depicted as "the son of (a) god" and "conqueror of the world." Although Domitian's son cannot be said to be holding the stars, some scholars have drawn parallels between the numismatic and biblical evidences. Frederick Murphy notes that "Revelation's image of Jesus with seven stars in his hand may be an allusion to that coin and an implicit critique of it. It is not the Roman imperial family that has cosmic significance, but Jesus."

Austin Farrer, on the other hand, takes them to be the seven classical planets, and interprets the vision as representing Christ's lordship over time.

See also
Chronology of Revelation
Resurrection appearances of Jesus
 Son of man (Christianity)
 Son of man (Judaism)

References

Biblical dreams and visions
Book of Revelation
Christology
Christophany
John the Apostle
Visions of Jesus and Mary